Gunnar Möller (1 July 1928 – 16 May 2017) was a German television and film actor. He appeared in over 160 film and television productions between 1940 and 2016. He was most successful as a leading man in German cinema of the 1950s, especially with his role in I Often Think of Piroschka (1955) with Liselotte Pulver. He later turned to character roles and worked for a number of years in England, including the supporting role of Hans van Broecken in World War II drama series Secret Army .

He was married to the actress Brigitte Rau until her death in 1979, when he killed her during an argument in London. He was sentenced to five years in prison in England, but served only two and was able to continue his career in Germany.

In 2003, he married actress Christiane Hammacher, with whom he had performed in "Loriots Dramatische Werke" ("Loriot's Dramatic Works") at Frankfurt's Fritz Rémond Theater and on tour during the 1980s.

Möller died on 16 May 2017 in his hometown Berlin, aged 88.

Selected filmography

 Our Miss Doctor (1940) - Ernst Schultze, Sextaner
 Kopf hoch, Johannes! (1941) - Wilhelm Panse
 Immer nur Du (1941) - Blumenjunge
 Her Other Self (1941) - Boy
 Sein Sohn (1942) - Willi, Herberts Sohn
 Between Heaven and Earth (1942)
 Meine Freundin Josefine (1942) - Bote
 Der Seniorchef (1942) - Willy, Stalljunge
 Floh im Ohr (1943) - Jungknecht Willi
 Circus Renz (1943) - Willi, Bäckerjunge
 Fritze Bollmann wollte angeln (1943) - Orje
 Meine vier Jungens (1944) - Ulf Mertens
 Junge Adler (1944) - Spatz
 The Degenhardts (1944)
 Ein Blick zurück (1944) - Botenjunge Max
 The Green Salon (1944) - Jörgeli
 The Noltenius Brothers (1945) - Jürgen Noltenius, Sohn
 Leb' wohl, Christina (1945) - Schüler Kälble
 Wozzeck (1947) - Student
 Thank You, I'm Fine (1948) - Günther Holk
 Heimliches Rendezvous (1949) - Fritzchen
 Where the Trains Go (1949) - Gustav Dussmann
 Ich mach dich glücklich (1949) - Franz
 After the Rain Comes Sunshine (1949) - Polizist Otto
 Hans im Glück (1949)
 Five Suspects (1950) - Ole Klimm
 Gabriela (1950) - Peter Hoyer
 Abundance of Life (1950) - Felix Engler, Student
 The Man Who Wanted to Live Twice (1950)
 Die Jungen vom Kranichsee (1950) - Schulhelfer Heider
 Taxi-Kitty (1950) - Boy Fritz
 A Heidelberg Romance (1951) - William Edwards jr
 The Imaginary Invalid (1952) - Peter
 A Thousand Red Roses Bloom (1952) - Himpemax
 Until We Meet Again (1952) - Pamelas Freund
 Holiday From Myself (1952) - Michael Matz, genannt Thomas
 Marriage for One Night (1953) - Putzi
 Salto Mortale (1953) - Kurt
 Dutch Girl (1953) - Jan
 The Dancing Heart (1953) - Viktor
 Wedding Bells (1954) - Klaus Eckhoff

 Love and Trumpets (1954) - Nikolaus von Laffen
 The Seven Dresses of Katrin (1954) - Hans, der Flieger
 A House Full of Love (1954) - Lutz
 Hoheit lassen bitten (1954) - Leutenant von Wörth
 Son Without a Home (1955) - Berthold Müller
 I Often Think of Piroschka (1955) - Andreas
 Rosmarie kommt aus Wildwest (1956) - Willy Sanders
 My Brother Joshua (1956) - Christoph Wiesner
 Was die Schwalbe sang (1956) - Peter Hansen
 Das Donkosakenlied (1956) - Dr. Heinz Stark
 The Tour Guide of Lisbon (1956) - Sebastian, Art Painter
 The Winemaker of Langenlois (1957) - Jörg Strasser, Volksschullehrer
 Wie schön, daß es dich gibt (1957) - Dr. Hubert Hinz
 The Daring Swimmer (1957) - Dr. Richard Moebius
 At Green Cockatoo by Night (1957) - Knut Peters, Medizinstudent
 Ist Mama nicht fabelhaft? (1958) - Axel Meinrad
 Thirteen Old Donkeys (1958) - Walter
 Stalingrad: Dogs, Do You Want to Live Forever? (1959) - Leutnant Fuhrmann
 SOS Pacific (1959) - Krauss
 Darkness Fell on Gotenhafen (1960) - Kurt Reiser
 Bombs on Monte Carlo (1960) - Burg
 The True Jacob (1960) - Jimmy
 Drei weiße Birken (1961) - Maler Fritz Mauschner
 Season in Salzburg (1961) - Dr. Erich Elz
 Freddy and the Song of the South Pacific (1962) - Hein
 The Post Has Gone (1962) - Franz
 Zwei blaue Vergissmeinnicht (1963) - Ronny
 Erotikon - Karussell der Leidenschaften (1963) - Der Freund
 Apartmentzauber (1963) - Thomas Butterfield jr.
 If You Go Swimming in Tenerife (1964) - Jens
 The Girl from the Islands (1964) - Jochen
 Liselotte of the Palatinate (1966) - Herzog von Kurland
 Days of Betrayal (1973) - Adolf Hitler
 The Odessa File (1974) - Karl Braun
 The Liberation of Prague (1977) - Adolf Hitler
  (1983, TV Movie) - Journalist Kaiser
 Die Nacht der vier Monde (1984) - Peter
 Der Geschichtenerzähler (1989) - Kommissar
  (2005) - Edmund
  (2015) - Ralf Kromberger
 The Confessions (2016) - (final film role)

References

External links

1928 births
2017 deaths
German male film actors
German male television actors
Male actors from Berlin
20th-century German male actors
21st-century German male actors